Luca Gozzo is an Italian footballer who plays for Frosinone U19, on loan from Crotone.

Career

Crotone 

As a youth player, Gozzo joined the youth academy of F.C. Crotone. In 2022, he was promoted to the first team.

Gozzo made his debut for then-Serie B side F.C. Crotone on 30 April 2022 as a late substitute in a 3-3 draw vs. Pordenone. Crotone were relegated to Serie C at the end of the season.

Loan to Frosinone 
Gozzo joined the U19 team of Serie B team Frosinone Calcio on loan, with an option to buy, for the 2022–23 season. He made his Campionato Primavera 1 debut on 28 August 2022 in a 2-0 loss vs. Lecce.

References 

2004 births
Living people